Camilo Ignacio Peña Díaz (born 5 June 1992), is a Chilean footballer who plays as a midfielder for Trasandino in the Chilean Primera División.

Club career
Camilo did all lower in Universidad Católica but his debut was in Trasandino.

External links

1992 births
Living people
Chilean footballers
Club Deportivo Universidad Católica footballers
Chilean people of Croatian descent
Association football midfielders